Love Swindler is a 1976 Hong Kong film directed by Li Han-hsiang. The film is rated in Category III.

Cast and roles

 Shirley Yu Sha Li
 Chen Ping
 Dana
 Wang Ping
 Yueh Hua
 Ku Feng
 Siu Yam Yam
 Hong Hoi
 Lau Luk Wa
 Tin Ching
 Chan Shen
 Cheng Siu Ping
 Cheung Chok Chow
 Cheung Hei
 Chiang Nan
 Fong Yuen
 Fung Ming
 Gam Tin Chue
 Hung Ling Ling
 Kok Lee Yan
 Kong Yeung
 Kwan Yan
 Liu Wai
 Lui Hung
 Ng Ming Tsui
 Ou-Yang Sha Fei
 Sai Gwa Paau
 Shum Lo
 Teresa Ha Ping
 Tsui Oi Sam
 Wang Han Chen

External links
 
 HK Cinemagic entry

Hong Kong romantic comedy films
1976 films
Shaw Brothers Studio films